Three Little Pigs is a chain of three small islands  northwest of Winter Island in the Argentine Islands, Wilhelm Archipelago. The chain was charted and named in 1935 by the British Graham Land Expedition (BGLE) under John Riddoch Rymill.

References

Islands of the Wilhelm Archipelago